The K14-K18 gas fields are significant natural gas producing areas in the Netherlands sector of the North Sea, about 120 km north west of Den Helder. These five contiguous fields started producing gas in 1977 and are still operational.

The fields 
The K14-K18 gas fields are located in the Southern North Sea. They extend over the Netherlands Offshore Blocks K14, K15, K16, K17 and K18. The gas reservoirs have the following properties:

Development 
The K14-K18 reservoirs were developed over an extended period by a number of offshore installations across the five Blocks.

K14 and K15 installations 
The initial installations in blocks K14 and K15 were:

Gas production from these platforms was to the following pipelines.

K14, K15 and K17 installations 
The fields were developed further from the mid-1980s through five satellite installations.  

Gas from the K14-FB1 installation is routed to the K14-FA1 installation. Gas from the K15 installations is routed to the K14-FA1 installation. Gas from the K17 Monotower is routed to the K14-FB1 installation.

K18 installations 
The K18 Golf gas field is a military restricted zone which necessitated development by subsea satellites. 

The output projection was 375.7 million normal cubic meters per year. Gas is routed to the K14-FA1 installation. 

The Kotter oil field is in Block K18, however there is no export route for the gas and the K18-FB gas accumulation has not been developed.

K16 Field 
The K16 Field is a stranded asset with no nearby gas transport infrastructure. The field has not been developed.

See also 

 Helder, Helm and Hoorn oil fields
 Kotter and Logger oil and gas fields
 L4-L7 gas fields
 L10 gas field
 K13 gas field
 K7-K12 gas fields

References 

 
North Sea energy
North Sea
Natural gas fields in the Netherlands